Victor Hansen (29 August 1889 – 6 March 1974) was a Danish jurist, entomologist and tennis player. As an entomologist he specialized in the beetles and is best known for his contributions to the beetle volumes of the Danmarks Fauna series. He competed in two events at the 1912 Summer Olympics.

Hansen studied law after going to the Metropolitanskolen and graduating in 1913 he joined the law ministry in 1915. He became a senior judge in 1941 and retired in 1959. Collecting beetles from the age of  22, he pursued entomology in his spare time throughout his life. His first publication was on the Danish Scydmaenidae (1911) and over his lifetime, he published numerous papers and 23 volumes on beetles in the series Danmarks Fauna. His collections are now held by the Zoological Museum, Copenhagen.

He was given an honorary doctorate by Copenhagen University in 1950.

References

External links
 

1889 births
1974 deaths
Danish male tennis players
Olympic tennis players of Denmark
Tennis players at the 1912 Summer Olympics
Sportspeople from Copenhagen
Danish entomologists
20th-century Danish zoologists